SING, also known as Super Impassioned Net Generation, is a Chinese girl group formed by KuGou Music in 2015 with 10 members, selected from different regions of China. The current line-up is composed of seven members, and they primarily produce electronic dance music inspired by traditional Chinese music.

History

2015: Formation and debut
SING debuted in 2015 with ten members on August 10, 2015. Given the limitations on budget, the group did not rely on income from concert tickets, instead gaining primary revenues from royalty, licensing fees, and selling merchandise.

2016: Line-up changes
Four members suspended their activities in 2016, and three new members were added to the group.

2017: Change in sound and breakthrough
In September, SING released the single "Moonlight Thoughts", their first ever Chinese-style electronic dance song. The single helped the group gain popularity and momentum in China. In December, the group held a Christmas live concert named Part of Me. Following the concert, Lin Jinyi suspended her activities due to health concerns.

In November, the group released their first international album SING on iTunes and Spotify.

2018-2019: Continued success

Three members of SING participated in the reality idol competition Produce 101 in March 2018. Jiang Shen and Xu Shiyin finished at 23rd and 75th place, respectively; Lai Meiyun made the final line up at 6th place and successfully debuted as a member of Rocket Girls.

SING performed on the 2nd International Youth Conference in Shenzhen on August 12. Sophie presented a speech titled "Integration of Youth Culture and Traditional Culture from the Perspective of Electronic Chinese Style Music" to introduce insights on young people's inheritance and innovation in traditional Chinese culture based on her personal experience.

SING joined the TV Show competition "Wo Yao Shang Chun Wan" (simplified chinese: 我要上春晚)  with "Moonlight Thoughts" on December 29, 2018. This TV show competition selected the performance for the CCTV Spring Festival Event. SING lost but advanced to the final through fan voting. (youtube )

Xu Shiyin released her first solo "Bai Yi Shao Nian" (Simplified Chinese: 白衣少年) on March 14 and its accompanying music video on June 26. The song was used as the ending theme for the drama "I Will Never Let You Go" (simplified chinese: 小女花不弃) which aired on January 8, 2019.

The variety show SING HOME began airing in 2019, with each episode having a different theme and featuring content such as playing games, team discussions, and interacting with fans.

Debbie released her first solo song "Mermaid" on January 4, and its music video on January 21. Debbie explained that she chose the title because she hoped her first solo would attract people to her, like the singing of a mermaid.

SING performed the song "Ru Meng Ling" (simplified chinese: 如梦令) in the final of "Wo Yao Shang Chun Wan" (simplified chinese: 我要上春晚) on January 26. They lost the judges vote 0–5 to their competitor. (youtube) SING, Han Xue, and Wu Mochou performed the song "Hui Jia Guo Nian La"(simplified chinese: 回家过年啦) on the CCTV Internet Spring Festival Event on January 28.(youtube) SING, Han Xue, and Oscar Qian performed the song "Nian Ye Fan" (simplified chinese: 年夜饭)  for the Hunan TV Spring Festival Event on January 29.(youtube)
SING performed the song "Huan Le Zhong Guo Nian" (simplified chinese: 欢乐中国年)  for the Jiangxi TV Spring Festival Event on February 3.(Weibo) SING performed the song "Tuan Tuan Yuan Yuan" (simplified chinese: 团团圆圆) for the CCTV Spring Festival Event Countdown on February 4.(bilibili) SING performed the song "Ru Meng Ling" (simplified chinese: 如梦令)  and "Qian Nian" (simplified chinese: 千年) for the GuangDong TV Spring Festival on February 4.(bilibili) Their song "Tuan Tuan Yuan Yuan" (simplified Chinese: 团团圆圆) was used as the background music of "The Reunion" on the 7th Hong Kong Lunar New Year Firework Show on February 6.

Xu Shiyin released her second solo "You Are Not Wrong" (simplified chinese : 是你没错了) on March 14. The song was written by Shiyin and composed by Mikey Jiao. It represented the discovery of her career and thanked the people who supported her.  She also released her third song "Yi Sheng Tian Ya"(simplified chinese: 一生天涯) on 12 November.

Debbie was invited to participate in the Asian Cultural Carnival on May 15. She performed the song "A Youthful Asia" with William Chan, Zhang Yixing, and Young Asia Group. SING performed the songs "Ru Meng Ling" (simplified chinese: 如梦令) and "Bu Xian" (simplified chinese: 不羡) on Yo!Bang on May 26.

Bian Li released her first solo "Someday" (Pinyin: Mou Yi Tian)(simplified chinese: 某一天) on July 5. Later, on November 4, she released her second song "Deng" (simplified chinese: 等).

On March 17, SING performed at the One Yeah Pop Up+ Festival held in Xi'an. SING then performed the songs "Guo Chao Shi Dai" (Simplified chinese: 国潮时代) and "Chuan Ren" (simplified chinese: 传人) in another edition of the same festival on May 11.

On August 8, SING released their Chinese Style Electronic Music digital album Jie Meng. The album includes three songs, which are "Jie Meng", "Shao Nian Zhong Guo" and "Pi Pa Xing". SING celebrated their 4th anniversary since debut and also released the song "Hua Qiang" (Simplified Chinese: 花枪) on October 25 in Beijing, China. On November 17, SING was announced as the winner of the Rising Popularity Group of the Year award and also performed the song "Hua Qiang" (Simplified Chinese: 花枪) at the Asia Music Festival 2019 in Shenzhen, China. On December 8, SING was announced as the winner of the New CPOP Generation of the Year award and also performed the song "Jie Meng" (Simplified Chinese: 解梦) at the Tencent Music Entertainment Festival 2019 in Macau, China.

Members
Current
Xu Shiyin (许诗茵) (Valentina)
Lin Jiahui(林嘉慧) 
Zhong Ying (钟颖) 
Ma Xuejiao (马雪娇) 
Yin Wanrui (尹万蕊)
Former
Lin Jinyi (林津伊) (Magical)
Cai Sha (蔡莎) (SaSa)
Wang Wenjie (王文洁) (Candy)
Chen Wenrou (陈温柔) (Ruby)
Gong Tianying (龚天颖) (Lorinda)
Lai Meiyun (赖美云) (Sunny) (Now a soloist under Qigu)
Bian Li (边丽) (Jessica)
Chen Li (陈丽) (Pink)
Jiang Shen (蒋申) (Debbie)
Qin Yu (秦瑜) (Sophie)
Lin Hui (林慧) (Haha)
Wu Yao (吴瑶) (Miko)

Discography

Studio albums

Singles

Accolades

Ku Music Asian Music Awards

|-
| 2018
| S.I.N.G (SING Girls)
| Rising Popularity Award
| 
|-

Tencent Streaming Award

|-
| 2018
| S.I.N.G (SING Girls)
| 2017 Rising Popularity Award
| 
|-

China Asia Musia Festival (AMF)

|-
| 2019
| S.I.N.G (SING Girls)
| 2019 Rising Popularity Award
| 
|-

Tencent Music Entertainment Awards 2019

|-
| 2019
| S.I.N.G (SING Girls)
| New CPOP Generation of the Year
| 
|-

Filmography

Films

Product Endorsements

References 

Chinese girl groups
Mandopop musical groups
Chinese pop music groups
Chinese dance music groups
Mandarin-language singers
Musical groups established in 2015
2015 establishments in China